Millene Karine Fernandes Arruda (born 13 December 1994), simply known as Millene, is a Brazilian professional footballer who plays as a forward for Corinthians and the Brazil women's national team.

International goals
Scores and results list Brazil's goal tally first

Honours

Club
Rio Preto
Campeonato Brasileiro de Futebol Feminino: 2015
Campeonato Paulista de Futebol Feminino: 2016, 2017

Corinthians
Campeonato Brasileiro de Futebol Feminino: 2018

National team
 Copa América Femenina: 2018

References

External links

1994 births
Living people
Women's association football forwards
Brazilian women's footballers
Sportspeople from Rondônia
Brazil women's international footballers
Rio Preto Esporte Clube players
Sport Club Corinthians Paulista (women) players
Sport Club Internacional (women) players